Pile Up is a compilation album by American queercore band Pansy Division, released on February 16, 1995, by Lookout! Records. The album compiles various singles, b-sides, cover songs and compilation appearances recorded between 1992 and 1995.

Allmusic gave the album a rating of 3 out of 5 stars, praising it as "some of the best of the Pansies, with a slew of covers and their best harmonies and tightest playing to date", though noted the "danger of becoming a one-joke band".

Track listing

Previous availability
Track 1 appeared on the Outpunk Dance Party CD compilation (1994)
Track 2 appeared on the A Slice of Lemon CD compilation (1995)
Tracks 3, 6 and 12 were from the Nine Inch Males E.P. 7-inch (1993)
Track 4 appeared on the "Stop Homophobia" split 7-inch (1994)
Tracks 8 and 12 comprise the "Bill & Ted's Homosexual Adventure" 7-inch (1993)
Tracks 9 and 10 comprise the "Jack U Off" 7-inch (1994)
Track 11 was the A-side of the "Jackson" 7-inch (1994)
Tracks 13 and 17 are from the "Touch My Joe Camel" 7-inch (1993)
Tracks 18 and 20 were B-sides on the "Fem in a Black Leather Jacket" 7-inch (1992)

Personnel
Pansy Division
Jon Ginoli – vocals, guitars
Chris Freeman – vocals, basses, lead guitars on tracks 12 and 14

Additional musicians
Calvin Johnson – vocals on track 11
Chris Bowe – bass on track 16
Liam Hart – drums on tracks 1, 2, 5, 7, 9-11
Patrick Hawley – drums on tracks 8, 12, 16–18, 20
David Ayer – drums on tracks 3, 4, 6, 14
David Ward – drums on tracks 13, 19

References

1995 albums
Pansy Division albums
Lookout! Records albums